Västerås Cathedral (Swedish: Västerås domkyrka) is the seat of the Diocese of Västerås in the Province of Västmanland, Sweden. The church building is a five-tiered cathedral, with copper-covered roof as well as a west tower with side extensions and an obelisk-shaped, copper-clad spire. It is built in the Scandinavian Brick Gothic style.

History
The present church was originally built as a three-storey Romanesque basilica in the 13th century and consecrated on 16 August 1271. It was dedicated to the Virgin Mary and John the Baptist. The cathedral has undergone numerous extensions since. The church was expanded eastward under Bishop Lydeke Abelsson in the 1460s. When a chapel in the southwestern corner of the church was added to 1517, the church reached its present size. The outer roof of copper was laid during the 17th century. The present Baroque spire from 1694 was designed by Nicodemus Tessin the Younger (1654–1728). The spire is built of oak, without iron beams or nails, and lined with copper. During the 1500s, 1600s and 1700s, there were also many fixtures that changed the interior. The organ was built in 1940 by Marcussen & Sön and is an electropneumatic organ.

Johannes Rudbeckius (1581–1646), was bishop at Västerås from 1619 until his death.
The cathedral houses the sarcophagus of Eric XIV of Sweden who was King of Sweden from 1560 until 1568.

Great organ 
"Organ builders P. L. Åkerman & Lunds Orgelfabriks Aktiebolag have completed in a praiseworthy manner the contract and the provisions of the estimate therein cited concerning the building of this organ, one of the most significant in our land and in more than one respect unique, whereby the organ is by us thoroughly approved".

From the inspection report of 8 March 1898

The above praise was written by Gustaf Hägg and August Lagergren, responsible for inspecting the great organ built by Åkerman & Lund in Stockholm and still used today. Originally, the organ had 40 stops over three manuals and pedals. This was the first large organ in Sweden to be built with tubular pneumatic action. The organ was also one of the first in Sweden to have high pressure stops – five of them, no less. The impressive organ façade was designed by Agi Lindegren.

During its long service, the organ has been enlarged a number of times, most recently in 1998 by the English company Harrison & Harrison Ltd. and in 2009 by the Swedish firm Åkerman & Lund orgelbyggeri AB. However, the basis of the instrument is still the organ of 1898. The renovation was seeking to recreate the monumental original sound of the instrument.

Today, it contains 65 stops over four manuals and pedals.

* = high pressure stops.

Gallery

References

Lutheran cathedrals in Sweden
Churches in Västmanland County
Västerås
Churches in the Diocese of Västerås
Buildings and structures in Västerås